Lionel Wigram may refer to;

 Lionel Wigram (film producer), producer and screenplay writer
 Lionel Wigram (British Army officer), Second World War British soldier and tactics instructor